Radha Mohan is an Indian film director of the South Indian film industry. He is known for his work in the films Mozhi (2007), Abhiyum Naanum (2008),  Payanam (2011) and  Kaatrin Mozhi (2018).

Career
Radha Mohan began work on his first film was Smile Please in 1996, which had dialogues written by his friend Babu, who had appeared in the lead role in En Uyir Thozhan (1990). The film was to star Prakash Raj in the lead role, but financial restraints meant that the film was later shelved. The film was later set for release during Diwali 1998 under the title of Ananthakrishnan, but still failed to clear financial hurdles.

The director worked under R. V. Udayakumar before he did his first film release, Azhagiya Theeye (2004). Known for his strong story lines and sensible and realistic portrayal of women, Mohan's films have largely been clean family entertainment. He has a penchant for humour in his films, and his films have been rib ticklers even though they carry strong messages and handling serious themes. Mozhi (2007) is his career's biggest hit, followed by Payanam (2011).

Filmography
All films are in Tamil, unless otherwise noted.

Awards

References

Tamil film directors
Telugu film directors
Film directors from Chennai
Living people
Tamil Nadu State Film Awards winners
21st-century Indian film directors
Screenwriters from Chennai
Year of birth missing (living people)